Walter Joachim (3 January 1901 – 1976) was an Austrian footballer. He played in four matches for the Austria national football team from 1917 to 1919.

References

External links
 

1901 births
1976 deaths
Austrian footballers
Austria international footballers
Place of birth missing
Association footballers not categorized by position